Pål Angelskår (born in Oslo, Norway in 1973) is a Norwegian musician from Oslo.

He started as a member of Reverend Lovejoy starting 1998. He is best known as the singer-songwriter in the Norwegian group Minor Majority starting 2000. Pål Angelskår was lead vocalist for the band and played guitar. He was joined by Jon Arild Stieng (vocals and guitars), Harald Sommerstad (keyboards), Henrik Harr Widerøe (bass, banjo, vocals) and Halvor Høgh Winsnes (drums).

In 2011, he published his poetry book in Norwegian titled "I sommer skal jeg gifte meg med Cecilie". In 2012, he released his first solo album Follow Me and in 2014, he released a collection of short stories titled "Er vi venner igjen?".

Discography

Albums
Solo

with Reverend Lovejoy
1998: Another Time, Another Place
2000: Polo is not the issue darling, Champagne is!
2003: Way Past Sorry
with Minor Majority
(for chart positions, refer to Minor Majority discography)
2001: Walking Home from Nicole's
2002: If I Told You, You Were Beautiful
2004: Up for You & I
2006: Reasons to Hang Around
2007: Candy Store
2009: Either Way I Think You Know

Singles
featured in
2007: "Living In Between" (MiNa feat. Pål Angelskår)
with Minor Majority
(for chart positions, refer to Minor Majority discography)
2006: "Come Back to Me"
2006: "Supergirl"

Bibliography
2011: "I sommer skal jeg gifte meg med Cecilie" (poems)
2014: "Er vi venner igjen?" (short stories)

References

Norwegian musicians
1973 births
Living people
Musicians from Oslo